SignalFx is a SaaS-based monitoring and analytics platform based in San Mateo, California, which allows customers to analyze, visualize, automate, and alert on metrics data from infrastructure, applications, microservices, containers, and functions. At the core of the platform is a streaming architecture that splits metric data points into two streams, one for human readable metadata and the other for time-series values. The data is routed through a pub-sub bus to SignalFlow, a python-like analytics language accessible through the main SignalFx GUI and through programmable API's. The platform is able to process millions of data points per second at a 1-second resolution with less than 2 seconds of latency, from ingestion to alert.

History
SignalFx was co-founded by Karthik Rau and Phillip Liu in February 2013. Phillip Liu previously worked at Facebook for four years as a software architect and Karthik Rau worked at Delphix and VMware. SignalFx received $8.5 million in a Series A investment from Andreessen Horowitz, adding Ben Horowitz to its board. In 2015 Signal Fx received $20 million in Series B investment led by Charles River Ventures with participation from Andreessen Horowitz, adding Devdutt Yellurkar to its board. In May 2018, SignalFx announced its Series D funding of $45million led by General Catalyst with participation from the existing investors Andreessen Horowitz and Charles River Ventures. In June 2019, the company raised $75million in its Series E round led by Tiger Global Management, bringing the companies total funding to $179million since its founding.

SignalFx currently serves over a hundred customers, including Athenahealth, Chairish, Ellie Mae, Carbonblack, Kayak, Shutterfly, Sunrun, and Yelp.

On August 21, 2019, SignalFx was acquired by Splunk for $1 billion.

References

External links
 

2013 establishments in California
2019 mergers and acquisitions
Software companies based in California
Defunct software companies of the United States
Splunk